Pacific Central Station is a railway station in Vancouver, British Columbia, Canada, which acts as the western terminus of Via Rail's cross-country The Canadian service to Toronto and the northern terminus of Amtrak's Cascades service to Seattle and Portland. The station is also Vancouver's main intercity bus terminal. The station is wheelchair accessible and is staffed with full Via services. The station is a candidate for the northern terminus of a possible future high-speed rail line being considered primarily by the US state of Washington.

History 

Pacific Central Station was built in 1917 by the Canadian Northern Railway as the terminus of its line to Edmonton. It was dedicated on November 2, 1919, a day after the first Canadian National trains began using the station. It was originally named False Creek Station and was designed by the architecture firm Pratt and Ross. The building was designated a heritage railway station in 1991.

Amtrak service to the terminal was originally offered on the Pacific International from 1972 to 1981, when it ceased due to budget cuts. Cross-border service returned in 1995 with the introduction of the Mount Baker International, which was later folded into the modern-day Cascades brand.

On November 8, 2010, the Canadian government announced a $5.1million plan to rebuild parts of the station, including refurbishing windows, masonry, and the roof of the building.

Services

Rail

Amtrak Cascades 
Amtrak Cascades provides two daily round trips between Vancouver and Seattle, Washington, with one daily train continuing to Portland, Oregon.

Amtrak passengers go through Canadian customs at the station upon arrival. Passengers bound for the United States go through United States border preclearance inside the station prior to boarding in Vancouver, with a brief 10-minute stop at the Peace Arch Border Crossing for agents to collect forms.

This is in contrast to Amtrak's international services on the East Coast (Adirondack to Montreal and Maple Leaf to Toronto) where passengers are processed by customs immediately after passing over the border.

To enable customs processing away from the border crossing, Amtrak trains are sequestered inside a secure caged area at Pacific Central Station. Additionally, trains make no stops in Canada other than at Pacific Central Station.

Via Rail Canadian  
Via Rail's Canadian train offers twice-weekly cross-country service to Toronto via Edmonton, Saskatoon, and Winnipeg; weekly service to Edmonton (summer only).

Bus 
Pacific Central Station is Vancouver's main intercity bus terminal.

Public transit 
Pacific Central Station is immediately adjacent to Main Street–Science World station on the Expo Line of Greater Vancouver's SkyTrain rapid transit system.

See also 
 Waterfront station (Vancouver), used by West Coast Express trains
 List of heritage buildings in Vancouver
 List of designated heritage railway stations of Canada

References

External links 
 Via Rail page for Vancouver train station (Pacific Central Station)

Via Rail stations in British Columbia
Buildings and structures in Vancouver
Heritage buildings in Vancouver
Transport in Greater Vancouver
Amtrak stations in Canada
Neoclassical architecture in Canada
Designated Heritage Railway Stations in British Columbia
Bus stations in British Columbia
Canadian National Railway stations in British Columbia
Transport infrastructure completed in 1919
Railway stations in Canada opened in 1919
1919 establishments in British Columbia
Juxtaposed border controls
Former Great Northern Railway (U.S.) stations